The anti-Zionist purge in the Polish Army was the removal of soldiers of Jewish origin from the Polish People's Army , carried out in 1968 following Six-Day War between Israel and Arab countries.

Background 
The Polish People's Army was a successor of the Polish armies formed in the Soviet Union during WW2. Due to the mass execution of Polish officers in the Katyn Massacre, most of the officers were people who were educated in the Soviet Union, with a large proportion having Jewish roots. Some Jewish officers were also promoted due to their suspected loyalty towards the Soviet Union.
Following the establishment of Israel in 1948, Stalin, disappointed by the pro-American stance of Israel, oriented the Soviet police against people with Jewish roots. However, this policy did not propagate to the Polish People's Army, where many officers sympathized with Israel. 
Following the Six-Day War, the Soviet Union considered military action against Israel and pressed on Eastern Bloc countries to break diplomatic ties with Israel.

March crisis 
Following a meeting of Eastern European countries in Moscow, Polish leadership realized that Poland and Israel are now firmly in two opposite blocs, and in the case of armed conflict, there could be a loyalty conflict for officers with Jewish roots.
As a result, in 1967-1968, Anti-Zionist purges were performed, and culminated in the so-called March events.

General Wojciech Jaruzelski, a member of the top management of the Ministry of Defense, and, from April 11, 1968, Minister of Defense, who headed a special committee, was to be responsible for the purge in the army. General Teodor Kufel, the head of the Military Internal Service was also co-responsible.

There is no unanimous agreement on the number of officers removed as part of the purge.  indicated the number of several dozen, Anka Grupińska - 150.  reported that six orders containing 1348 names (both officers and petty officers) had survived, and added that soldiers of Jewish origin were being removed from the army by General Jaruzelski in 1980.

The people affected by the purge were deprived of the officer rank "because of the lack of moral values" and demoted (e. g. ).

Anti-Semitic character of purges 
During the purge, a number of officers were dismissed only because of their Jewish roots and without proof of their loyalty towards Israel. This lends the purge an Anti-Semitic character.

References 

Polish Land Forces
Antisemitism in Poland
Political and cultural purges
Polish People's Republic
1960s in Poland